The 2014 Sacramento Challenger was a professional tennis tournament played on hard courts. It was the ninth edition of the tournament which was part of the 2014 ATP Challenger Tour. It took place in Sacramento, California, United States between 29 September and 5 October 2014.

Singles main-draw entrants

Seeds

 Rankings are as of September 22, 2014.

Other entrants
The following players received wildcards into the singles main draw:
 Daniel Nguyen
 Bjorn Fratangelo
 Stefan Kozlov
 Collin Altamirano

The following player received entry as a special exemption into the singles main draw:
  Jared Donaldson

The following player received entry as an alternate into the singles main draw:
  Elias Ymer

The following players received entry with a protected ranking into the singles main draw:
  Tennys Sandgren
  John Millman

The following players received entry from the qualifying draw:
  Liam Broady
  Marcos Giron
  Dimitar Kutrovsky
  Eric Quigley

Champions

Singles

 Sam Querrey def.  Stefan Kozlov, 6–3, 6–4

Doubles

 Adam Hubble /  John-Patrick Smith def.  Peter Polansky /  Adil Shamasdin, 6–3, 6–2

External links
Official Website

 
Sacramento Challenger
Sacramento Challenger
Sacramento Challenger
Sacramento Challenger
Sacramento Challenger